Events from the year 1597 in art.

Events

Works

Federico Barocci - Nativity (Museo del Prado)
Caravaggio
Penitent Magdalene
Rest on the Flight into Egypt
Medusa (second version)
Jupiter, Neptune and Pluto (Villa Ludovisi, Rome)
Dong Qichang - Wanluan Thatched Hall
Marcus Gheeraerts the Younger - Robert Devereux, 2nd Earl of Essex, in Garter robes (approximate date)
El Greco - The Saint Joseph and the Christ Child (including a view of Toledo, Spain)
Christ Pantocrator together with the twelve apostles, above the entrance gate of the Holy Virgin main church in the Rohzen Monastery, Bulgaria

Births
February 2 - Jacob van Campen, Dutch artist and architect of the Golden Age (died 1657)
March 10 - Ercole Gennari, Italian Renaissance drawer and painter (died 1658)
June 9 - Pieter Jansz Saenredam, Dutch painter of structures, architectural portraitist (died 1665)
July 2 - Theodoor Rombouts, Flemish painter (died 1637)
September 28 - Justus Sustermans, Flemish painter in the Baroque style (died 1681)
date unknown
Claude Audran the Elder, French engraver (died 1677)
Orfeo Boselli, Italian sculptor working in Rome (died 1667)
Salomon de Bray (or Braij), Dutch painter (died 1664)
Pedro de Obregón, Spanish painter and printmaker (died 1659)
Henricus Hondius II, Dutch engraver, cartographer and publisher (died 1651)
Juan Ribalta, Spanish painter (died 1628)
Xiang Shengmo, Chinese painter in the Qing Dynasty (died 1658)
probable
Jan van Bijlert, Dutch painter, co-founder of the Bentvueghels (died 1671)
Pieter Claesz, Dutch still life painter (died 1660)
Giacomo di Castro, Italian painter (died 1687)
Ludovico Lana, Italian painter, mainly active in Modena (died 1646)
Johann Liss, German-born painter (died c. 1631)

Deaths
February 2 - Lucas van Valckenborch, Flemish landscape painter (b. c.1535)
September 28 - Hendrick van den Broeck, Flemish painter active mainly in Rome (born 1519)
date unknown
Giovanni Battista de'Cavalieri, Italian engraver (born 1526)
Prospero Fontana, Italian painter of the late Renaissance (born 1512)
Francesco Morandini, Italian painter active in Florence (born 1544)
Willem Thibaut, Dutch Golden Age painter (born 1524)

 
Years of the 16th century in art